The Constellation Energy Classic was a golf tournament on the Champions Tour from 1998 to 2006. It was last played in Hunt Valley, Maryland at the Hayfields Country Club.

The purse for the 2006 tournament was US$1,750,000, with $255,000 going to the winner. The tournament was founded in 1998 as the State Farm Senior Classic.

Winners
2006 Bob Gilder
2005 Bob Gilder
2004 Wayne Levi
2003 Larry Nelson

Greater Baltimore Classic
2002 J. C. Snead

State Farm Senior Classic
2001 Allen Doyle
2000 Leonard Thompson
1999 Christy O'Connor Jnr
1998 Bruce Summerhays

Source:

References

External links
PGATOUR.com tournament website

Former PGA Tour Champions events
Golf in Maryland
Recurring sporting events established in 1999
Recurring sporting events disestablished in 2005